Caegarw is a large village situated in Mountain Ash, in Rhondda Cynon Taff, Wales.

Location 
It is close to Cefnpennar and Cwmpennar. It is about a 2-minute walk from Mountain Ash town centre.

Facilities 
A parish church, three public houses, a bowling club, YMCA, fish and chip shop, village shops, Job Centre, primary school (Caegarw Primary School), hospital and a large park and playing fields and two barber shops.

References 

Villages in Rhondda Cynon Taf
Mountain Ash, Rhondda Cynon Taf